Mount Treadwell is a mountain (820 m) at the southeast extremity of the Swanson Mountains, in the Ford Ranges of Marie Byrd Land, Antarctica.

It was mapped by the United States Antarctic Service (USAS) (1939–41) and by United States Geological Survey (USGS) from surveys and U.S. Navy air photos (1959–65). It was named in 1969 by Advisory Committee on Antarctic Names (US-ACAN) for Captain T.K. Treadwell, U.S. Navy, who earlier had been Deputy Commander as well as Commander, U.S. Naval Oceanographic Office.

Mountains of Marie Byrd Land